Shivajirao Patil Kavhekar is the former Member of Legislative Assembly from Maharashtra in the Government of Maharashtra during 1995–1999. He recently joined Indian National Congress on 2 October 2009. Prior to joining Congress he Contested Latur seat from the Bharatiya Janata Party (BJP).

Political career
Kavhekar, who defeated Vilasrao Deshmukh in the 1995 Assembly polls from Latur. Kavhekar, who as a Janata Dal candidate defeated Vilasrao Deshmukh by over 30,000 votes. Later in 1999 he joined hands with Nationalist Congress Party and tried his hand in the Assembly polls.

Kavhekar quit Nationalist Congress Party and joined BJP. On 2 October 2009, he joined Indian National Congress party at Tilak Bhavan in the presence of Manikrao Thakre and withdrew his nominations from Latur City and Latur Rural Assembly seats.
Recently in 2019 he again joined BJP.

References

External links

 http://www.dnaindia.com/mumbai/report_vilasrao-s-political-heir-in-battle-for-latur_1293980
 http://wikimapia.org/528701/Mr-Shivajirao-Patil-Kawhekar-s-Home
 http://www.indianexpress.com/news/vilasraos-political-heir-in-battle-for-latur/523253/
 http://www.sakaaltimes.com/2009/09/30130859/Vilasraos-political-heir-in-b.html
 http://www.ptinews.com/news/304183_Deshmukh-woos-Kavhekar-to-join-Congress
 http://www.rediff.com/rediffsearch/Shivajirao%20Patil%20Kavhekar
 http://www.zeenews.com/news566860.html
 http://www.siasat.com/english/news/deshmukh-woos-kavhekar-join-congress
 http://in.news.yahoo.com/20/20090928/1416/tnl-deshmukh-woos-kavhekar-to-join-congr.html
 http://www.dnaindia.com/mumbai/report_vilasrao-s-political-heir-in-battle-for-latur_1293980
 http://www.dailyexcelsior.com/web1/04oct16/national.htm
 http://news.outlookindia.com/item.aspx?660493

People from Latur
People from Maharashtra
Indian National Congress politicians
Marathi politicians
Maharashtra MLAs 1995–1999
Living people
People from Marathwada
Bharatiya Janata Party politicians from Maharashtra
Janata Dal politicians
Nationalist Congress Party politicians from Maharashtra
Year of birth missing (living people)
Indian National Congress politicians from Maharashtra